Leonardo Giordani (born 27 May 1977) is an Italian former racing cyclist, who competed as a professional from 2000 to 2013. He most notably won the under-23 road race at the 1999 UCI Road World Championships.

Major results

1995
 2nd Trofeo Buffoni
1997
 1st Gran Premio Chianti Colline d'Elsa
 1st Stages 2 (TTT & 4 Giro della Valle d'Aosta
 2nd Gran Premio di Poggiana
1998
 1st Piccolo Giro di Lombardia
 1st Gran Premio Chianti Colline d'Elsa
 2nd Overall Giro della Valle d'Aosta
1st Stage 2
 2nd Piccola Sanremo
1999
 1st  Road race, UCI Under-23 Road World Championships
 1st Overall Giro delle Regioni
1st Stage 3
 1st Trofeo Gianfranco Bianchin
2002
 7th Giro dell'Emilia
 10th Giro del Lazio
2003
 9th Overall Brixia Tour
2005
 2nd Coppa Agostoni
 6th GP Città di Camaiore
 6th Trofeo Matteotti
2006
 6th Rund um Köln
2008
 4th Firenze–Pistoia
 5th Overall Giro della Provincia di Grosseto
 5th Giro del Veneto
 5th Memorial Marco Pantani
 9th Overall GP CTT Correios de Portugal
2010
 7th Coppa Agostoni

Grand Tour general classification results timeline

References

External links

1977 births
Living people
Cyclists from Rome
Italian male cyclists